Walter Witold Majchrzycki (4 February 1909 – 3 December 1993) was a Polish boxer who competed in the 1928 Summer Olympics.

He was born in Berlin, German Empire, and died in Poznań.

In 1928 he was eliminated in the second round of the lightweight class after losing his bout to the upcoming silver medalist Stephen Halaiko.

References

External links
 profile 

1909 births
1993 deaths
Boxers at the 1928 Summer Olympics
Boxers from Berlin
Lightweight boxers
Olympic boxers of Poland
Polish male boxers
20th-century Polish people